Gabrielle Tana is a British film producer. Tana and her fellow producers were nominated for an Academy Award for Best Picture for the 2013 film Philomena.

Filmography
 Someone Else's America (1995)
 Animals (1998)
 On the Ropes (1999)
 The Moth (2002)
 The Duchess (2008)
 Coriolanus (2011)
 The Invisible Woman (2013)
 Philomena (2013)
 Run (short) (2013)
 Dancer (Documentary) (2016)
 Mindhorn (2016)
 Ideal Home (2018)
 The White Crow (2018)
 Stan & Ollie (2018)
 My Zoe (2018)
 The Dig (2021)
 Thirteen Lives (2022)

References

External links

British film producers
Living people
Year of birth missing (living people)
Place of birth missing (living people)